Pyribenzoxim, also known as LGC-40863, is a synthetic herbicide.

References

External links

Pyrimidines
Phenol ethers
Carboxylate esters
Oxime esters
Herbicides